"Quiero Bailar" ('I Want To Dance') is a song by Puerto Rican reggaetón recording artist Ivy Queen, from the platinum edition of her third studio album, Diva (2003). It was composed by Queen alongside her then-husband Gran Omar, produced by Iván Joy and released as the lead single from the album in 2004. Lyrically, "the song talks about a guy expecting sex after a dance like it was a bad thing."

The song along with the album Diva are considered to be an important factor to reggaeton's mainstream exposure in 2004 alongside Daddy Yankee's Barrio Fino and Tego Calderon's El Enemy de los Guasibiri. The song became the first Spanish-language song to reach #1 on Miami's WPOW Rhythmic Top 40 while reaching the Top 10 of the Billboard Latin Rhythm Airplay chart. The song has become known as the first female reggaeton feminist anthem among songs that lyrically degraded women. An accompanying music video was filmed for the song. It features cameos from her ex-husband Omar Navarro, known artistically as Gran Omar. Ivy Queen performed the song as a part of the set of her 2008 World Tour which was held from the José Miguel Agrelot Coliseum in San Juan, Puerto Rico.

In 2019, the song was re-recorded by a women-led team of engineers and released as a single on International Women’s Day. In 2022, Rolling Stone magazine listed the song at number two on their list of the best Reggaeton songs of all time.

Background
After the disappointing commercial performance of Ivy Queen's first two studio albums En Mi Imperio (1997) and The Original Rude Girl (1998), she was dropped from the Sony label and took a hiatus from her musical career in 1999. Though the moderate hit, "In The Zone" with Wyclef Jean was able to chart in the United States, the unsuccessful second single "Ritmo Latino" and the album The Original Rude Girl were not and were overlooked and soon forgotten. However, it was critically acclaimed by many including an editor for Allmusic who awarded the album four out of five stars and listed it as a selected "Allmusic Pick". This occurred after she left Sony and "stepped out of Wyclef Jean's shadow".

In 2001 and 2002, Queen began appearing on reggaeton compilation albums spawning hits like "Quiero Bailar" which is originally from The Majestic 2 and "Quiero Saber" from Kilates. In 2003, Queen and her then-husband Gran Omar signed with Real Music, an independent label based in Miami, Florida and established by Jorge Guadalupe and Anthony Pérez. They appeared on the label's first album Jams Vol. 1 which Pérez released after several major record labels turn him down. She benefited from Pérez producing the important reggaetón television show "The Roof", which aired on mun2 and detailed urban music and lifestyle by frequently appearing and performing on the show. After the success of her third studio album Diva (2003), which would be certified platinum by the Recording Industry Association of America (RIAA), Ivy Queen released a platinum edition to the album in 2004 with bonus tracks, of those included are "Quiero Bailar" and the singles "Quiero Saber", "Papi Te Quiero" and "Tu No Puedes".

Composition

"Quiero Bailar" was written by Ivy Queen. It was produced by the Puerto Rican reggaetón producer Iván Joy, who also produced "Quiero Saber". Originally featured on Iván Joy's reggaetón compilation album, The Majestic (2002), the song was also later included on Queen's fifth studio album, Flashback (2005) and second compilation album, Reggaeton Queen (2006) and first EP, e5 (2006).

The song incorporates the Liquid riddim, a musical riddim produced by the "Jamaican cross-over guru" Jeremy Harding. The song's lyrics warn her dance partner not to misinterpret her moves. In the song, she berates a lover who thinks that just because they dance she is automatically going to bed with him.

Release and chart performance
"Quiero Bailar" was released in 2003 as the lead single from the album by Universal Music Latino followed by five more singles. On the Billboard Hot Latin Songs chart, the song debuted at thirty-five for the week of September 3, 2005, becoming the "Hot Shot Debut" of the week and peaked at number twenty-nine for the week of September 17, 2005. Billboard Latin Rhythm Songs chart, the song peaked at number eight. On the Billboard Tropical Songs chart, the song debuted as "Yo Quiero Bailar" at number thirty-seven on the week of December 20, 2003 and peaked at number twenty-four on January 17, 2004.

It re-entered the Billboard Tropical Songs chart as "Quiero Bailar" at number thirty-six on the week of March 6, 2004 and peaked at number sixteen for the week of July 9, 2005. The song became the first Spanish-language track to reach number one on Miami's WPOW Rhythmic Top 40, an American radio station based in Miami, Florida that did not usually play Spanish music. "I've worked very hard in my career, but I get surprised because I've never expected to get to these places." Ivy Queen said. "When I read Sony's reports and they tell me my albums are being heard in London and my song is number one, I get surprised and look for explanations."

Music video

A music video for the song was filmed and released. Although, it has not been posted to any of Queen’s official accounts, there are multiple unofficial postings of the video on YouTube that have garnered over one million views each, including: 161,194,079 views, 50,054,378 views, 23,982,594 views, 22,055,522 views, 15,131,577 views, 13,241,069 views, 10,263,099 views, 4,311,195 views, 3,677,399 views, 2,780,826 views, 2,007,497 views, 1,909,762 views, bringing the total to 310,608,997 views as of December 2022.

Critical reception and legacy
Jonathan Widran of AllMusic described the track as a song that "gets the party and people moving" and as well as being one of Ivy Queen's hits. Ramiro Burr of Billboard stated that "Quiero Bailar" shows how effortlessly and quickly she alternately sings and raps, claiming that she has a distinct vocal style that evokes Gwen Stefani. Kid Curry, program director of the Rhythmic Top 40 WPOW (Power 96) radio station, cites Ivy Queen's release of "Yo Quiero Bailar" as "the last reggaetón super-hit". In 2017, the song was included on Billboard's 12 Best Dancehall & Reggaeton Choruses of the 21st Century at number ten. Later that year, the online magazine Pop Sugar listed the song as one of the best reggaeton songs of all time. It was also listed as one of 15 essential Reggaetón songs that are not "Despacito." Rolling Stone ranked the song on its chronicle list of the 50 Greatest Latin Pop Songs of all time. The song ranked at number 60 on NPR Music's list of the 200 Best Songs by 21st Century Women. In 2022, Rolling Stone listed the song at number 2 on its list of the 100 Greatest Reggaeton Songs of All Time.

Cover versions
"Quiero Bailar" was covered by Puerto Rican rapper Dlaklle on the reggaetón compilation album Reggaetón 30 Pegaditas (2005). Recording artist Abaya covered "Quiero Bailar" on the album Evolución Urbana (2005). Boricua Boys also included their rendition of the song on their second album Reggaetón (2006). The song’s chorus was sampled by Ecuadorian singer Sophy Mell, on her 2018 single, Ponte Pa Mi, with Puerto Rican duo Jowell & Randy. Chilean singer Paloma Mami, also interpolated its chorus on her 2019 single, "Mami."

Track listing
Album version
"Quiero Bailar" — 

Extended Play (EP)
"Cuéntale" — 
"Libertad" — 
"Te He Querido, Te He Llorado" — 
"Quiero Bailar" — 
"Quiero Saber" —

Charts

2019 re-recording

Background
Im August 2018, the music streaming service Spotify created the Equal Studio Residency program from women. In a partnership with Berklee College of Music and Electric Lady Studios, the program was created to "help open the door for emerging female producers and engineers while shining a light on the great work already being done by women in the music industry."

Recording
The song was recorded by a female-led team of engineers in February 2019. Kerry Steib, Spotify's Director of Social Impact called Queen "a legend who has been talking about—and been a role model for—empowerment throughout her career." The song was almost entirely performed, engineered, mixed, and mastered by women. The only exception was the song's producer, Julio Cartagena. It was released as a single exclusively on Spotify on March 5, 2019. The song's release was used to celebrate International Women's Day.

References

External links
 "Quiero Bailar" / "Quiero Saber" music video at Youtube

2003 singles
2004 songs
2005 songs
2019 singles
Ivy Queen songs
Spanish-language songs
Songs written by Ivy Queen
Songs with feminist themes
Songs about casual sex
Universal Music Latino singles
Songs written by Gran Omar